Ground Force One is the unofficial code-name for the black armored buses used to transport the president of the United States and other dignitaries.

The United States Secret Service formerly used rented buses as part of the presidential motorcade, with retro-fitting for secure communications where necessary. In August 2011 the Secret Service introduced a new permanent addition to the federal government's fleet, initially for use by Barack Obama in the campaign leading up to the 2012 presidential election.

The newly designed model X3-45 VIP 3 axle shell was designed by Quebec, Canada-based specialist firm Prevost Car, and then fitted out by Hemphill Brothers Coach Company in Nashville, Tennessee, to provide  of interior space, including flashing police-style red and blue lights on the front and the back. It was then further outfitted by the Secret Service with secure communications and other specialized equipment. The two buses cost $1.1 million each, and were leased from Hemphill Brothers during the Obama administration.

The coaches are part of the federal government fleet and are painted plain black. The second bus was used by Republican presidential nominee Mitt Romney during the campaign leading up to the 2012 presidential election, and then deployed as a back-up for visiting dignitaries.

See also 

 Presidential state car
 Air Force One
 Army One
 Navy One
 Marine One
 Coast Guard One
 Executive One

References

Customised buses
Transportation of the president of the United States
Road transport of heads of state
Vehicles of the United States